Jerzy Kaczmarek (born 8 January 1948) is a Polish fencer. He won a gold medal in the team foil event at the 1972 Summer Olympics.

References

1948 births
Living people
Polish male fencers
Olympic fencers of Poland
Fencers at the 1972 Summer Olympics
Olympic gold medalists for Poland
Olympic medalists in fencing
People from Lubsko
Medalists at the 1972 Summer Olympics
Sportspeople from Lubusz Voivodeship
20th-century Polish people
21st-century Polish people